Erik Rud Brandt (16 October 1943 – 11 March 2023) was a Danish fashion designer. In 1966 he married Margit Brandt and founded his own design company in Copenhagen with branches in Scandinavia, Switzerland, Canada, United States, Japan, and Australia. In 1981 they established Brandt's America, in New York City.

References

 Erik og Margit Brandt, kapitel 1: Superparret: Lad os danse på roser. Portræt: Erik og Margit Brandt  Politiken | 21 July 2002 | Liv_og_stil | Side 4

References

1943 births
2023 deaths
Danish fashion designers